Min Lee (born 3 June 1995) is a Taiwanese professional golfer who plays on the LPGA Tour.

Early life and amateur career
Lee started playing golf at the age of 12 years old and is a skilled pianist. She was a member of the Taiwan National Team and won two tournaments on the 2012 China Amateur Golf Tour, at Qinhuangdao and Chongqing.

Professional career
Lee turned professional in 2012 and was Rookie of the Year on the 2014 Symetra Tour and finished 5th in the rankings, earning promotion to the LPGA Tour. In 2015, she finished T12 at the U.S. Women's Open and 68th on the LPGA Tour money list. In 2016, she dropped to 94th and in 2017 to 128th. In 2019, she was back on the Symetra Tour where she won the Valley Forge Invitational.

Lee has also won four tournaments on the Taiwan LPGA Tour and won the 2018 China Women's Open on the China LPGA Tour.

Lee spent 2020 home in Taiwan due to the COVID-19 pandemic. Back on the LPGA Tour in 2021, she was runner-up behind Matilda Castren at the 2021 LPGA Mediheal Championship, the week after she won the Mission Inn Resort & Club Championship on the Symetra Tour. These performances saw her rise to 119 in the Women's World Golf Rankings, which helped her qualify for the 2020 Summer Olympics in Tokyo.

Professional wins (9)

Symetra Tour wins (3)
2014 Garden City Charity Classic
2019 Valley Forge Invitational
2021 Mission Inn Resort and Club Championship

China LPGA Tour wins (1)
2018 China Women's Open

Taiwan LPGA Tour wins (5)
2016 TLPGA Open
2017 Hitachi Ladies Classic 
2018 Taiwan Mobile Ladies Open
2020 Party Golfers Ladies Open
2021 WPG Ladies Open

Results in LPGA majors
Results not in chronological order.

CUT = missed the half-way cut
NT = no tournament
"T" = tied

References

External links

Taiwanese female golfers
LPGA Tour golfers
Olympic golfers of Taiwan
Golfers at the 2020 Summer Olympics
Sportspeople from Taipei
1995 births
Living people